Alan Shinkfield is an Australian writer based in Emu Park, mainly covering the field of Christianity and Christian beliefs.

Career
Alan Shinkfield was born in a middle-class family. Although the family was not practicing, Shinkfield found interest in religion through his primary education and co-curricular activities. Shinkfield spent most of his childhood studying and working on small jobs to cover his expenses. Shinkfield notably became interested in music and played various instruments, eventually learning from a voice production instructor based in Melbourne.

Shinkfield started writing after an MVA made him an invalid pensioner and later an aged pensioner. On an electric typewriter the first book took about ten years. After becoming a pensioner he sought volunteer work in community and sporting fields. Shinkfield's works for Christianity came into the limelight once he started helping in the services at the Methodist Church. His routine position was that of a sales representative. He became a part of a group comprising 16 to 20 people. The group traveled about 100 miles a weekend preaching with one of the layman's understandings of the Book of Revelation. Eventually, his preaching expanded to the whole of Eastern Australia. He married in 1954, having four girls and two boys.

Shinkfield became renowned for his works and was cited as a notable writer in Social News, Telegra, and ArticleBiz among others.

Books
 A Layman's Understanding of Satan's Evil
 What Everyone Should Know but It Is Not Taught in School!
 Beulah
 The Book That No One Should Read!
 Christianity
 A Full Circle!

References

Writers from Melbourne
People from Ormond, Victoria
20th-century Australian writers
Australian Christians
Christian writers